Chichester Dam is a minor concrete gravity dam across the Chichester and Wangat rivers, upstream of  Dungog, in the Hunter Region of New South Wales, Australia. The dam's main purpose is water supply for the Lower Hunter region. A mini hydro-electric power station operates at times of peak flow and is connected to the national grid. The impounded reservoir is Lake Chichester.

Location and features
The dam contributes about thirty-five percent of the lower Hunter region's water supply.

The wall is anchored to the bedrock below it by 93 stressed tendons. At 100% capacity the dam wall holds back  of water at  AHD. The spillway is capable of discharging .

History
Land for the water supply scheme was appropriated in the Gazette of 6 October 1916. To safeguard the purity of the water the populated part of the Wangat Valley, including the old goldmining town of Wangat, and the greater portion of the populated part of the Chichester Valley were resumed. The Act appropriated A£ as the estimated cost of construction of the dam, with additional funds set aside for land resumption.

In 1985 the dam was post tensioned with cables and the spillway was relocated to the centre of the dam and returned to its original height. In 1995 the seepage potential was reduced under the northern abutment and in 2003 an improved drainage system for the dam's foundations was installed and the left parapet wall was raised to prevent overtopping in a major flood.

Power generation
Following a report by the Health Rivers Commission, in 1998 the Minister for Urban Affairs and Planning, Craig Knowles, announced that a small hydro-electric power station would be installed in the Chichester Dam in order to generate electricity, reduce greenhouse emissions and allow surplus power to be sold back to the grid.

See also

 List of dams and reservoirs in New South Wales

References

External links

 
 

Dams completed in 1926
Energy infrastructure completed in 2001
Dams in New South Wales
Dungog Shire
Hunter Region
Gravity dams
Hydroelectric power stations in New South Wales
Reservoirs in New South Wales